The 1983 Camel GT Championship season was the 13th season of the IMSA GT Championship auto racing series.  It was for GTP class prototypes and GTO and GTU class Grand Tourer-style racing cars.  It began February 5, 1983, and ended November 27, 1983, after seventeen rounds.

Schedule
The GT and Prototype classes did not participate in all events, nor did they race together at shorter events.  Races marked with All had all classes on track at the same time.

Season results

† - #9 Personalized Autohaus won the 12 Hours of Sebring overall.

External links
 World Sports Racing Prototypes - 1983 IMSA GT Championship results

IMSA GT Championship seasons
IMSA GT